Terry Leon Bradshaw (born February 3, 1969) is an American professional baseball coach and former outfielder. He was the hitting coach for the Kansas City Royals of Major League Baseball (MLB).

Career
Born in Franklin, Virginia, Bradshaw graduated from Windsor High School (Virginia) and attended Norfolk State University. He was selected by the St. Louis Cardinals in the ninth round of the 1990 Major League Baseball Draft and played for five seasons in the Cardinals' minor league system, and stole 65 bases in the Class A South Atlantic League. As a rookie with the 1995 Cardinals, Bradshaw had three hits in his first three MLB at bats from May 4–6 against the Houston Astros. But he spent most of that season at Triple-A Louisville.

In parts of two seasons with the Cardinals (1995–96), he collected 17 total hits in 34 games played, including two doubles and one triple. His minor league career extended until 1999 and included time in the minor league organizations of the Royals and Montreal Expos.

He has served as a coach in the Kansas City Royals organization since 2000. He spent 2013 through 2017 as the Royals' minor league hitting coordinator, and was promoted to Royals hitting coach prior to the 2018 season. The Royals fired him on May 16, 2022.

References

External links

Northwest Arkansas Naturals profile

1969 births
Living people
African-American baseball coaches
African-American baseball players
American expatriate baseball players in Canada
Arkansas Travelers players
Baseball coaches from Virginia
Baseball players from Virginia
Hamilton Redbirds players
Kansas City Royals coaches
Louisville Redbirds players
Major League Baseball hitting coaches
Major League Baseball outfielders
Minor league baseball coaches
Norfolk State Spartans baseball players
Omaha Royals players
Ottawa Lynx players
People from Franklin, Virginia
Savannah Cardinals players
Sportspeople from Hampton, Virginia
St. Louis Cardinals players
St. Petersburg Cardinals players